The American Society for Eighteenth-Century Studies (ASECS) is an academic society for humanities research related to the "long" eighteenth century, from the later seventeenth through the early nineteenth centuries. ASECS was established in 1969, and has been an affiliate of the American Historical Association (AHA) since 2000. ASECS is an interdisciplinary society in the sense that its members come from a wide range of humanities disciplines, including history, literature, philosophy, art history, and musicology. The society organizes an annual conference and sponsors two publications: the quarterly journal Eighteenth-Century Studies and the annual volume Studies in Eighteenth-Century Culture.

References

External links
Eighteenth-Century Studies
Studies in Eighteenth-Century Culture

Literary societies
Clubs and societies in the United States
1969 establishments in the United States
Organizations established in 1969